The NASCAR Mexico Series (formerly NASCAR Corona Series and other names) is a NASCAR series in Mexico. It is the most prestigious stock car racing series in the country.

Origins (Desafío Corona)

The Desafío Corona was established in 2004 by NASCAR Mexico, a joint-venture between NASCAR and Mexican entertainment group OCESA, with the idea of developing stock car racing in Mexico, and fueling a transition from the country's historically Open-wheel car racing fan base to stock car racing.

From 2004 to 2006, the Desafío Corona grew considerably in infrastructure, as well as in number of fans, drivers and sponsors.

Present

The NASCAR Mexico Corona Series was officially presented at the 2006 Desafío Corona award ceremony. Toyota assumed naming rights in 2012, dubbing it the NASCAR Toyota Series.

The series is one of three NASCAR-sanctioned international series, the others are the NASCAR Pinty's Series and the NASCAR Whelen Euro Series. Following North American short-track racing trends to cut costs and unify rules among different tours, NASCAR is considering changes to the Canadian Tire and Corona Series where the two series adopt the Busch rules as to allow the competitors to use the same cars in NASCAR Busch Series races.

The winner of the series championship received an invitation to the UNOH Battle at the Beach, formerly the Toyota All-Star Showdown. All other drivers may also attempt to qualify by entering the heat races.

2016 hiatus
After the end of the 2015 season, the series was suspended supposedly due to the fact that organizers of the series wanted to instead support the Formula One Mexican Grand Prix, which had just been revived for 2015. Several of the teams and drivers that participated in the series moved to the Super Copa Telcel "V8" series.

2017 return
In October 2016 it was announced that the series would return with new sponsorship from PEAK Antifreeze, with an exhibition race that December to be followed by a full 2017 season.

Also in 2017 two supporter series were created: the NASCAR FedEx Challenge Series and NASCAR Mikel's Truck Series.

The series lost its sponsorship with PEAK Antifreeze in 2023, which was when a playoff system was implemented to the series.

Mexico Series tracks
In its 14 seasons, the NASCAR PEAK Mexico Series has used 16 tracks in 14 venues (two in Santiago de Querétaro and two in San Luis Potosí). Currently, six oval tracks are used, only Autódromo Monterrey is a road circuit. Three tracks have been used in two configurations. Autódromo Monterrey long and frijol, Autódromo Hermanos Rodríguez in NASCAR Nationwide and oval, Autódromo Miguel E. Abed in a 2.75 km layout and oval.

Autódromo Potosino is the shortest track (0.804 km) and Autódromo Monterrey the longest (3.4 km).

San Luis Potosí is the venue with more races (34, 32 in Autódromo Potosino and 2 in Parque Tangamanga II)

NASCAR Mexico had powered the construction of oval tracks in México, Autódromo Potosino was remodeled in 2001, Aguascalientes, Chiapas, Querétaro had new tracks for NASCAR events. In 2012, a speedway in Chihuahua was scheduled for inauguration.

For 2013, a race in the Southwestern United States was held: a 75-lap, 75-mile (122 km) race at Phoenix International Raceway during the NASCAR Cup Series Subway Fresh Fit 500 weekend.

Cars

In the first season, only General Motors (through its Pontiac division) and Dodge participated in the series. Ford made its debut in 2005 with its Mustang model, but since 2006, the Fusion is the Ford model entry. In 2009, Toyota started its participation with its Camry. The Mazda 6 was first entered in 2010.  As with the other NASCAR divisions in the United States, Dodge subsequently pulled its factory support and no longer participates in the Mexican series.

Along with the other international series, the K&N Pro Series East and West, and the ARCA Menards Series, the Mexico Series has General Tire as an exclusive tire supplier.

Most wins

Specifications

Chassis: Steel tube frame with safety roll cage, must be NASCAR standards.
Engine Displacement:  (350 in³) V8.
Transmission: 4 Speed Manual.
Weight:  Minimum (without driver).
Power Output: 400 hp.
Torque: .
Fuel: 98 octane unleaded gasoline provided by Pemex.
Fuel capacity: .
Fuel delivery: Carburetion.
Compression ratio: 9.3:1.
Aspiration: Naturally aspirated.
Wheelbase: .
Tires: Slick tires provided by General Tire.
Length: .
Width: .
Height: .
Safety equipment: HANS device, Seat belt.

Champions

Six drivers have won the championship. The Telcel team is the most successful with four drivers' championships. Rubén García, Jr. is the youngest champion (20 years old), and Rafael Martínez the eldest. (45 years old). Germán Quiroga has the most championships to his name at 3.

Rookie of the Year

Series winners

List of winners
Updated after 2022 Monterrey2 (November 27, 2022)

University of Northwestern Ohio Battle at the Beach

Mexico Series champions are invited to the NASCAR Toyota All-Star Showdown (now the University of Northwestern Ohio Battle at the Beach). In 2011 Daniel Suárez, Germán Quiroga and Rubén Rovelo took part. They finished in 11th, 12th and 30th, respectly.

The 2012 Series champion, along with international counterparts in Canada and Europe, will be invited to participate with an automatically exempt entry in any of the three divisions (Late Model, K&N Pro, Whelen Modified) in the Battle at the Beach, which will be held a week and a half before the series race at Phoenix International Raceway.

Female drivers

To date, three women have started a NCS race. Mara Reyes scored a pole position in her first race.

Other NASCAR series

Some drivers of NASCAR PEAK Mexico Series have taken part in Xfinity Series and Gander RV & Outdoors Truck Series action, but only Jorge Goeters and Daniel Suárez have both raced in the NASCAR Cup Series and NASCAR PEAK Mexico Series. Scott Riggs, Cody Ware, Kevin O'Connell all of them only made one start in PEAK Mexico Series but also had run in both series. Rubén Pardo, Rogelio López and Rubén García Jr. have won in the K&N Pro Series East; while Daniel Suárez have won in the K&N Pro Series East, the NASCAR Xfinity Series, NASCAR Gander Outdoors Truck Series and NASCAR Cup Series. In 2016, Suárez won the NASCAR Xfinity Series championship, driving for Joe Gibbs Racing. In 2017 and 2018, he moved to the NASCAR Cup Series driving No. 19 for Joe Gibbs Racing. In 2019, he moved to the No. 41 driving for Stewart-Haas Racing before moving to the No. 96 driving for Gaunt Brothers Racing, then moved to the No. 99 for Trackhouse Racing Team. On June 12th, 2022, Suárez won his first career NASCAR Cup Series race at Sonoma Raceway.

NASCAR Cup Series drivers
Five drivers have raced both the NASCAR PEAK Mexico and NASCAR Cup Series.

References

External links

 

 
Recurring sporting events established in 2004
Stock car racing